Cowan is a populated place in Buffalo Township, Union County, Pennsylvania, United States.  Notable institutions in Cowan include Bucknell University's Forrest D. Brown Conference Center.

History
In the 1860s, Cowan was known as Farmersville.  Trinity Lutheran Church was founded in 1871.

References

External links

Unincorporated communities in Union County, Pennsylvania
Unincorporated communities in Pennsylvania